Karl Ditlev Rygh (7 June 1839 – 10 March 1915) was a Norwegian archaeologist and politician for the Conservative Party.

He was born in Verdal, and was the brother of Evald og Oluf Rygh. He graduated as cand.philol. in 1863. He was hired as a teacher at Trondheim Cathedral School in 1866, and worked as headmaster there from 1887 to 1899. From 1868 he was a member of the Royal Norwegian Society of Sciences and Letters; he served as praeses of the organization from 1883 to 1897. As an archaeologist Rygh specialized in Norway north of Dovrefjell, especially Trøndelag. When his brother Oluf died, Karl Ditlev Rygh helped finish his main work, the nineteen-volume Norske Gaardnavne.

He was elected to the Norwegian Parliament in 1886, 1889 and 1892, representing the constituency of Trondhjem og Levanger. He had served as a deputy representative during the term 1883–1885.

References

1839 births
1915 deaths
Norwegian archaeologists
Royal Norwegian Society of Sciences and Letters
Members of the Storting
Politicians from Trondheim
Conservative Party (Norway) politicians
People from Verdal